Lufeng railway station may refer to:
 Lufeng railway station (Yunnan) (禄丰站), a railway station of Chengdu–Kunming railway in Lufeng County, Yunnan, China
 Lufeng railway station (Guangdong) (陆丰站), a railway station of Xiamen–Shenzhen railway in Guangdong, China